Fernanda Ferreira may refer to:
 Fernanda Ferreira (volleyball player)
 Fernanda Ferreira (psychologist)
 Fernanda Ferreira (rower)

See also
 Fernando Ferreira (disambiguation)